is a former tennis player from Japan.

Career
Sakai, a student of Waseda University, competed in the 1970 Summer Universiade, which was held in Turin, Italy. He and Jun Kamiwazumi won the doubles gold medal for Japan.

When the Japanese Davis Cup side upset Australia in 1971, Sakai played a large role, winning both of his matches, over Colin Dibley and the deciding fifth rubber against John Cooper. Sakai made the third round of the 1971 US Open, beating Vitas Gerulaitis and Ross Case.

In 1972, Sakai was semi-finalist in the U.S. Men's Clay Court Championships.

At Wimbledon in 1973, Sakai was eliminated in the third round by Ilie Năstase, having earlier secured wins over Frew McMillan and Hans Kary. In Osaka later that year, he beat Zeljko Franulovic in the semi-finals to make it into his first Grand Prix final, which he lost to Ken Rosewall. In 1973 he also managed to defeat John Newcombe in a Davis Cup match.

He had his best Grand Slam performance at the 1974 French Open, where he reached the third round of the singles draw and was a quarter-finalist in the men's doubles, with Kenichi Hirai. The same player partnered Sakai in the Düsseldorf Grand Prix tournament that year and the pair finished as runners-up. Sakai and Hirai also won the men's doubles gold medal at the 1974 Asian Games in Tehran. It was Sakai's second gold medal of the tournament, having also won a gold medal in the singles, beating Iranian local Taghi Akbari in the final.

In 1975, Sakai made his final Davis Cup appearances for Japan and registered his 20th and final win, over Phil Dent. He took part in a total of 19 ties during his career.

Grand Prix career finals

Singles: 1 (0–1)

Doubles: 1 (0–1)

References

1947 births
Living people
Japanese male tennis players
Asian Games medalists in tennis
Sportspeople from Tokyo
Tennis players at the 1974 Asian Games
Asian Games gold medalists for Japan
Medalists at the 1974 Asian Games
Universiade medalists in tennis
Universiade gold medalists for Japan
Medalists at the 1970 Summer Universiade
20th-century Japanese people
21st-century Japanese people